The heavy equipment and weaponry of the Hellenic Army is of mostly foreign manufacture, from American, French, German, Russian and other suppliers. The only domestically produced systems have been the ELBO Leonidas APC and the ELBO Kentaurus IFV. However, in the last few years, the Greek Defence Industry has advanced significantly. One great example of this is the new Hoplite MRAP by EODH.

Equipment runs the gamut from state-of-the-art to obsolescent Cold War inventories; the latter are gradually being retired as no funds are available for upgrade. Russian made equipment was received or purchased after the collapse of the Warsaw Pact and second hand US and German equipment was transferred or purchased.

Recent defence spending cuts have had a big impact in operating costs (maintenance, technical support, operational training, transport and supplies). As 80% of the budget is spent on salaries and administrative costs the Hellenic Army faces the challenge of reorganizing its structure. This may lead to closing down some of the 500 military bases scattered across the country and reducing the size of the Army, transforming the Hellenic Army into a smaller but largely professional force.

Under the Force Structure 2005-2020 plan large-scale changes in the Army will be implemented. Only two categories of units will exist: active and mobilized (reserve). No main weapon systems will be allocated to mobilized units.

Small arms and infantry support weapons

Firearms

Infantry support weapons

Land vehicles and heavy armament

Main battle tanks

Greek CFE treaty limit: 1,735

Armored fighting vehicles/carriers 
Greek CFE treaty limit: 2,498 (IFVs / APCs).

Engineering vehicles

Logistics & Support

Artillery 
Greek CFE treaty limit: 1,920 (calibres > 100mm)

Signals Corps

Air defence systems

Aircraft

Future procurements/projects 

Majority of these plans are under review to be accepted or denied by the Hellenic defence ministry and Hellenic national staff.

See also 

List of equipment of the Cypriot National Guard
List of active Hellenic Navy ships
List of decommissioned ships of the Hellenic Navy
List of aircraft of the Hellenic Air Force
List of historic aircraft of the Hellenic Air Force
List of former equipment of the Hellenic Armed Forces

References 

Hellenic Army
Hellenic Army
Equipment
Military equipment of Greece